Obulavaripalle mandal is one of the 50 mandals in Annamayya district of the Indian state of Andhra Pradesh. It is under the administration of Rajampeta revenue division, with its headquarters at Mangampet town. The mandal is bounded by Kodur, Chitvel and Pullampeta mandals. Construction of a new railway line Obulavaripalle–Krishnapatnam section connecting Obulavaripalle railway station to Krishnapatnam port is in progress.

Geology: national geological monument

Volcanogenic bedded Barytes of Mangampet at Mangampeta in Obulavaripalle manda has been declared the National Geological Monuments of India by the Geological Survey of India (GSI), for their protection, maintenance, promotion and enhancement of geotourism.

Towns and villages 
 census, the mandal has 15 settlements, which includes 1 census town and 14 villages. Mangampet is the only urban settlement, categorised as a census town in the mandal.

The settlements in the mandal are listed below:

''Note: C.T-census town

References 

Mandals in Kadapa district
National Geological Monuments in India